Nai Gaj is an ephemeral river in Dadu District of Sindh, Pakistan. The Government of Pakistan build the Nai Gaj Dam on its course. Nai Gaj drains part of the Kirthar Mountains, and flows from Balochistan province towards Sindh. It ends at Lake Manchar after flowing through the arid areas of Kachho in Dadu District.

Gallery

References

Canals in Pakistan
Irrigation canals
Dadu District